Lorma is a genus of herbivorous Coccinellidae containing a single species, L. haliki, described from Sao Paulo, Brazil.

References 

Coccinellidae genera
Monotypic Cucujiformia genera